Ministry of Water Resources and Environment is the Algerian Ministry responsible for matters relating to water within the Algerian government. It is sometimes called "MWR", having its headquarters at Kouba, Algiers.

References

External links 

 Algerian Ministry of Water Resources, official website 

Water Resources
Algeria, Water Resources
Algeria, Water Resources